Liang Jinrong (born May 21, 1960) is a Chinese chess Grandmaster. 

In 1997, he became China's 7th Grandmaster.

He has played for Shandong chess club in the China Chess League.

Career

He gained the GM title in 1997. He was National Chess Champion twice in 1995 and 2000.

He competed for the China national chess team for a total of seven times at the Chess Olympiads (1978–1986, 1990–1992) with an overall record of 70 games played (+23, =30, -17); one World Men's Team Chess Championship (1989) with an overall record of 3 games played (+0, =2, -1); and eight Men's Asian Team Chess Championships (1979–1983, 1987, 1991–1999) with an overall record of 41 games played (+25, =13, -3). 

He reached his highest FIDE rating of 2536 in January 2000.

See also
Chess in China

References

External links
Liang Jinrong - New In Chess. NICBase Online.
FIDE Chess Player card - Individual Calculations

Chessmetrics Career Ratings for Liang Jinrong
Elo rating with world rankings and historical development since 1990 (benoni.de/schach/elo) for Liang Jinrong

1960 births
Living people
Chess grandmasters
Chess players from Guangzhou